The First League of the Republika Srpska 2004-05 was the 10th since its establishment.

League table

External links 
 FSRS official website.

Bos
2004–05 in Bosnia and Herzegovina football
First League of the Republika Srpska seasons